The 1991 430 km of Nürburgring was the fifth round of the 1991 World Sportscar Championship season, taking place at Nürburgring, Germany.  It took place on August 18, 1991.  The two Jaguars finished six laps ahead of the third-placed Porsche.

Official results
Class winners in bold.  Cars failing to complete 90% of the winner's distance marked as Not Classified (NC).

Statistics
 Pole Position - Teo Fabi (#4 Silk Cut Jaguar) - 1:19.519
 Fastest Lap - Teo Fabi (#4 Silk Cut Jaguar) - 1:21.553
 Average Speed - 180.183 km/h

References

External links
 WSPR-Racing - 1991 Nürburgring results

Nurburgring
6 Hours of Nürburgring
Nurburgring